Constantin Ciucă (born 20 September 1941) is a Romanian boxer. He competed at the 1964 Summer Olympics and the 1968 Summer Olympics. At the 1968 Summer Olympics, he defeated Boujemaa Hilmann of Morocco, before losing to Artur Olech of Poland.

References

External links

1941 births
Living people
Flyweight boxers
Romanian male boxers
Olympic boxers of Romania
Boxers at the 1964 Summer Olympics
Boxers at the 1968 Summer Olympics
People from Mehedinți County